Cerace lemeepauli is a species of moth of the family Tortricidae. It is found in northern Vietnam.

The wingspan is about 51 mm. The species is externally similar to Cerace stipatana, however, the female genitalia are distinct.

References

Moths described in 1950
Ceracini